Pompeius is a genus of skippers in the family Hesperiidae.

Species
Pompeius amblyspila (Mabille, 1897)
Pompeius darina Evans, 1955
Pompeius pompeius (Latreille, [1824])
Pompeius postpuncta (Draudt, 1923)

Former species
Pompeius dares (Plötz, 1883) - transferred to Vernia dares (Plötz, 1883)
Pompeius verna (Edwards, 1862) - transferred to Vernia dares (Edwards, 1862)

References
Natural History Museum Lepidoptera genus database
Pompeius at funet

Hesperiinae
Hesperiidae genera
Taxa named by William Harry Evans